Luis Filipe de Sousa Carreira  (31 December 1976 Angola;– 15 November 2012) was a Portuguese motorcycle road racer. He died on 15 November 2012 after an accident during qualifying in the 2012 Macau Motorcycle Grand Prix.

Career highlights

 1998 – 1st place in Troféu Super CBR 600 (Portuguese championship)
 2000 – 2nd place in Troféu Honda Hornet (Portuguese championship)
 2001 – 1st place in Troféu Honda CBR 600 (Portuguese championship)
 2002 – 7th place in Portuguese Stocksport 1000 (Portuguese championship)
 2003 – 3rd place in Portuguese Stocksport 1000 (Portuguese championship)
 2004 – 4th place in Portuguese Stocksport 1000 (Portuguese championship)
 2004 – 21st place in GP Macau
 2005 – 1st place in I GP Internacional de Angola
 2005 – 2nd place in II GP Internacional de Angola
 2004 – 3rd place in Portuguese Stocksport 1000 (Portuguese championship)
 2006 – 14th place in GP Macau
 2007 – 1st place in Troféu Resistência Vodafone (Portuguese Trophy)
 2007 – 9th place in GP Macau
 2007 – 2nd place in Portuguese Stocksport 1000 (Portuguese championship)
 2008 – 1st place in Portuguese Stocksport 1000 (Portuguese championship)
 2008 – 4th place in GP Macau
 2008 – Wild Card at WSBK Portimão
 2009 – 1st place in Portuguese Stocksport 1000 (Portuguese championship)
 2009 – 1st place in Troféu Resistência Vodafone (Portuguese Trophy)
 2009 – 8th place in GP Macau
 2009 – 12th place in Albacete European Championship
 2009 – 18th place in Sénior Isle of Man TT (Best Rookie)
 2010 – 1st place in Portuguese Stocksport 1000 (Portuguese championship)
 2010 – 1st place in Resistência Estoril 500 km – Angotruck
 2010 – 17th place in Sénior Isle of Man TT (Superstock class)
 2010 – 22nd place in Sénior Isle of Man TT (Superbike class)
 2011 – 11th place in NW 200 (Best Rookie)
 2011 – 13th place in Isle of Man TT (Superstock class)
 2011 – 16th place in Isle of Man TT (Supersport class)

References

  Luis Carreira to ride for CD Racing at the 2011 Isle of Man TT – IOMTT Official website 2011/02/22
  Portuguese star prepares for TT debut – IOMTT Official website 2009/05/11
 STATEMENT OF THE MACAU GRAND PRIX COMMITTEE – MGPC Official website 2012/11/15

External links
 Luis Carreira Official website

1976 births
2012 deaths
Sportspeople from Lisbon
Superbike World Championship riders
Portuguese motorcycle racers
Isle of Man TT riders
Motorcycle racers who died while racing
Sport deaths in Macau
Filmed deaths in motorsport